Albert Turner may refer to:
 Albert Turner (footballer, born 1901) (1901–1985), English footballer
 Albert Turner (footballer, born 1907) (1907–1959), English footballer 
 Albert Turner (activist) (1936–2000), American civil rights advocate

See also
Bert Turner (disambiguation)